Pedro Antonio Kohji Aparicio Mori (born 11 June 1982 in Lima) is a Peruvian footballer who plays as a center back. He has played for several Peruvian clubs, and currently plays for Deportivo UPAO in the Peruvian Second Division.

Honours

Club
Alianza Lima
 Peruvian First Division (1): 2001

References

External links
 
 

1982 births
Living people
Footballers from Lima
Peruvian people of Japanese descent
Association football central defenders
Peruvian footballers
Club Alianza Lima footballers
Atlético Universidad footballers
Estudiantes de Medicina footballers
Club Deportivo Universidad César Vallejo footballers
FBC Melgar footballers
Sport Boys footballers